Karlovci can refer to:

 Sremski Karlovci, a town and municipality in Srem, Vojvodina, Serbia
 Novi Karlovci, a village in Srem, Vojvodina, Serbia